The 1996 Suntory Asian Classic was a professional ranking snooker tournament that took place between 9–15 September 1996 at the Riverside Montien Hotel in Bangkok, Thailand.

Ronnie O'Sullivan won the tournament, defeating Brian Morgan 9–8 in the final. The defending champion John Parrott was eliminated by Rod Lawler in the first round.


Wildcard round

Main draw

References

Dubai Classic
1996 in snooker
1996 in Thai sport
Snooker in Thailand
Sports competitions in Bangkok